Cleto may refer to:

People
 Albino Mamede Cleto (1935–2012), Portuguese Roman Catholic bishop
 Cleto Bellucci (1921–2013), Italian Prelate of Roman Catholic Church
 Cleto González Víquez (1858–1937), Costa Rican president
 Cleto Maule (1931–2013), Italian racing cyclist
 Cleto Rodríguez, American soldier
 Isaac Cleto Hassan, South Sudanese physician and politician
 Maikel Cleto (born 1989), Dominican baseball pitcher

Places
 Cleto, Calabria, town in the province of Cosenza in southern Italy
 José Cleto Airport, also known as União da Vitória Airport, Brazil